Bazaria ruscinonella is a species of snout moth in the genus Bazaria. It was described by Émile Louis Ragonot, in 1888. It is found in France, Spain and Portugal.

The species was named in reference to Ruscino, the name of the first city of Perpignan (Pyrénées-Orientales, France) in ancient times, where Ragonot found it for the first time.

References

Moths described in 1888
Phycitini
Moths of Europe
Taxa named by Émile Louis Ragonot